Muni may refer to:

Municipal
 A common US abbreviation for municipal, municipal services, and the like
Municipal bond
Municipal Bridge, the former name of the George Rogers Clark Memorial Bridge in Louisville, Kentucky
"Muni", slang for a municipally owned and operated golf course
The Muny, an outdoor musical theatre in St. Louis, Missouri
Cleveland Public Power, known as Muny Light before 1983
San Francisco Municipal Railway, the public transit agency for San Francisco, California
Springfield Municipal Opera in Springfield, Illinois
Muni Metro in San Francisco

People
Surname
Craig Muni (born 1962), former professional ice hockey player
Ganapati Muni (1878–1936), Indian philosopher
Marguerite Muni (1929–1999), French actress sometimes credited as simply Muni
Paul Muni (1895–1967), American actor
Scott Muni (1930–2004), American disc jockey
Given name
Muni, baby boy name. Indian meaning: silent.
Munni Begum, Pakistani folk singer

Fictional characters  
 Munni, child mute character from film Bajrangi Bhaijaan
 Munni, item number character from item number Munni Badnaam Hui in the film Dabangg, portrayed by Malaika Arora

Other uses
An abbreviation for mountain unicycling
Muni (film), a Tamil film released in 2007
 Muni (film series), a Tamil horror film series 
Muni River, a river in Equatorial Guinea
Muni Village, Arua District, Uganda
Río Muni, the continental region of Equatorial Guinea, named after the river Muni
Masaryk University (muni.cz), in Brno, Czech Republic
Munisuvrata, 20th Jain Tirthankara
Rishi Muni, an ascetic who engages himself in devotion with silence
Jain Muni, a Jain monk
Muni (Hinduism), woman in mythology
Muni (Saint)